Zella or Zalla ( az-Zallah) is an oasis in the northeastern Fezzan region of southwest Libya. The Sahara Desert town is approximately halfway between Marada and Hun in the Jufra District.

Features
Zella is the site of an ancient Berber castle. There are a number of smaller oases in the vicinity, such as Trezah, Meduin and Tagreft. Zella is a gateway to Alharuj Al Asswad.

See also
 List of cities in Libya

Populated places in Jufra District
Oases of Libya